Henry St. John, 4th Viscount Bolingbroke (6 March 1786 – 1 October 1851) was the son of George Richard St John, 3rd Viscount Bolingbroke and Charlotte Collins.

Marriage and children 
Henry married Maria, daughter of Sir Henry Paulet St John Mildmay in 1812 at St George's, Hanover Square in 1812. The couple had six children - Maria Louisa (b. 1813), Anne Jane Charlotte (b. 1814), Isabella Letitia (b. 1816), Emily Arabella Jane (b. 1817), Henry (b. 1820) and Spencer (b. 1822).

Death 
Henry died on 1 October 1851 while visiting his daughter in Elgin. He was buried in the family vault at St Mary's Church in Lydiard Tregoze on 7 October 1851. He was succeeded by his son Henry

The Bolingbroke Peerage 
 Henry St John, 1st Viscount Bolingbroke
 Frederick St John, 2nd Viscount Bolingbroke
 George Richard St John, 3rd Viscount Bolingbroke
 Henry St John, 4th Viscount Bolingbroke, 5th Baron St John
 Henry St John, 5th Viscount Bolingbroke
 Vernon Henry St John, 6th Viscount Bolingbroke

References 

Viscounts in the Peerage of Great Britain
1786 births
1851 deaths